Abdikarim Dhaaye was the minister for the Development and Natural Resources department of the Khatumo State in Somalia from 2012 until 2017. In 2012, he took part in the ceremony for the opening of the Taleh airport. In July 2016, he hosted a peace conference in Nairobi.

See also
Politics of Somalia

References 

Living people
Somalian politicians
Year of birth missing (living people)